David Jones (born 1 April 1955) is an Australian former soccer player and coach.

Club career
Jones was born in Fremantle, Western Australia. A defender, he played his junior soccer for Kwinana United before graduating to the senior team in 1970. He remained with the club until the end of the 1975 season, when he won the Rothmans Gold Medal award for the season's fairest and best player. In 1976 Jones played for East Fremantle Tricolore. In the first year of the National Soccer League in 1977 he played for West Adelaide and was part of the club's championship winning team the following year. In all, he played five seasons in South Australia including two with Adelaide City. He later had a brief playing stint with South Melbourne before joining Preston Makedonia. He moved back to Western Australia in 1985, playing with Perth Azzurri.

State career
Jones represented Western Australia 24 times, winning two Marah Halim Cup championships.

International career
In 1975 Jones made his debut for Australia against Singapore in Singapore. He played a total of five full international matches for the Socceroos, the last being a match against Greece in Adelaide in July 1978.

Coaching career
In 1994 Jones was head coach at Croydon City in the Victorian State League.

Honours
East Fremantle Tricolore
 D'Orsogna Cup: 1976

Western Australia
 Marah Halim Cup Winner: 1975, 1976

Individual
 Gold Medal (Best and Fairest player in WA State League): 1975
 Football Hall of Fame Western Australia inductee: 1996

References

Living people
1955 births
Sportspeople from Fremantle
Australian soccer players
Association football defenders
Australia international soccer players
West Adelaide SC players